Paul Butler may refer to:

 Paul Butler (artist) (born 1973), Canadian artist
 Paul Butler (bishop) (born 1955), Bishop of Durham; previously Bishop of Southwell and Nottingham, and Bishop of Southampton
 Paul Butler (boxer) (born 1988), English boxer of the 2010s
 Paul Butler (cricketer) (born 1963), former English cricketer
 Paul Butler (football coach), English football coach
 Paul Butler (footballer, born 1964), English football (soccer) player
 Paul Butler (footballer, born 1972), English-born football (soccer) player who played for the Republic of Ireland
 Paul Butler (lawyer) (1905–1961), American lawyer, chairman of the US Democratic National Committee
 Paul Butler (politician), Northern Irish politician for Lagan Valley, and former PIRA member
 Paul Butler (polo) (1892–1981), American heir, businessman and polo player
 Paul Butler (professor) (born 1961), professor of law, former federal prosecutor
 R. Paul Butler, American astronomer
 Paul Dalrymple Butler (1886–1955), British diplomat
 Paul Butler (actor), actor (Crime Story)
 Paul Butler (musician), singer and guitarist (The Bees)